Out Here is the fifth album by the American rock band Love, released in December 1969 on Blue Thumb Records in the United States, and Harvest in the United Kingdom.

Album profile
Recording three LPs worth of material with a new line-up, Lee gave ten songs to Elektra Records in order to fulfill the contract that had been in place for nearly four years. Four Sail was released in August 1969.

Arranging the two remaining LPs into a double album, Lee signed a new contract with Blue Thumb Records and oversaw the release of the seventeen-track Out Here in December 1969, four months after Elektra released Four Sail. It was released on the EMI-HARVEST label in the UK (SHDW 3/4) May, 1970.

The Out Here title came from the name of the cover painting, created by Burt Shonberg in 1965.

In May 2007, the album was released as the first disc of The Blue Thumb Recordings by Universal's Hip-O Select division.  Its only appearance on compact disc before this was a 1990 reissue distributed through MCA.  (The British label Ace put together an official compilation called Out There, featuring most of the songs from Out Here but filled the rest of the disc with songs not associated with the album.)

In 1982, eight songs from Out Here were used to fill out the first side of an album titled Studio/Live, released on MCA Records. Three of the songs were edited specifically for this release: "Doggone" (from 12:00 to 3:14); "Love Is More Than Words or Better Late Than Never" (from 11:20 to 2:25); and "Gather Round" (from 4:50 to 3:41). Studio/Live was issued on CD by One Way Records in 1991. The live side was recorded at Bill Graham's Fillmore East.

Track listing
All songs by Arthur Lee, unless noted.
Side A
 "I'll Pray for You" – 3:50
 "Abalony" – 1:50
 "Signed D.C." – 5:15
 "Listen to My Song" – 2:28
 "I'm Down" – 3:48
Side B
 "Stand Out" – 3:00
 "Discharged" – 1:30
 "Doggone" – 12:00
Side C
 "I Still Wonder" (Jay Donnellan, Arthur Lee) – 3:05
 "Love Is More Than Words or Better Late Than Never" – 11:20
 "Nice to Be" – 1:50
 "Car Lights On in the Daytime Blues" – 1:10
Side D
 "Run to the Top" – 3:00
 "Willow Willow" – 3:22
 "Instra-Mental" – 3:00
 "You Are Something" – 2:05
 "Gather 'Round" – 4:50

Personnel
 Arthur Lee - lead vocals, rhythm guitar, piano, organ
 Jay Donnellan - lead guitar
 Frank Fayad - bass
 George Suranovich - drums
 Paul Martin - lead guitar (track 5)
 Gary Rowles - lead guitar (track 10)
 Drachen Theaker - drums (track 3)

Additional
 Jim Hobson - organ, piano (tracks 1 & 13)
 George Gaal, Arthur Lee - engineers
 Burt Shonberg - album cover artwork

References

1969 albums
Love (band) albums
Harvest Records albums
Blue Thumb Records albums
Albums recorded at Sunset Sound Recorders